General Simón Bolívar is one of the 39 municipalities of Durango, in north-western Mexico. The municipal seat lies at General Simón Bolívar. The municipality covers an area of 10,041 km².

In 2010, the municipality had a total population of 10,629, up from 9,569 in 2005.

In 2010, the town of General Simón Bolívar had a population of 1,321. Other than the town of General Simón Bolívar, the municipality had 54 localities, the largest of which (with 2010 populations in parentheses) were: San José de Zaragoza (1,321) and Ignacio Zaragoza (1,019), classified as rural.

See also
Simón Bolívar, the Liberator of South America, after whom these places are named.

References

Municipalities of Durango